The Noah's Ark Trap is an album by English folk singer Nic Jones, released in 1977.

Track listing
"The Wanton Seed" 3:37
"Jackie Tar" 3:19
"Ten Thousand Miles" 3:22
"The Golden Glove" 5:51
"The Indian Lass" 5:56
"Miles Weatherhill" 3:17
"Reel" 2:39
"Isle of France" 5:17
"Crockery Ware" 5:15
"Annachie Gordon" 6:33

References

1977 albums
Nic Jones albums